The 2005 Rally Catalunya was the 15th round of the 2005 World Rally Championship. It took place between 28 and 30 October 2005. Citroën's Sébastien Loeb won the race, his 20th win in the World Rally Championship. Thanks to François Duval's second place, Citroën also secured its manufacturers' title. Mikko Hirvonen was third to take his first WRC podium.

Results

References

External links

 Results at ewrc-results.com

Rally Catalunya
Rally Catalunya